The Lightship is a 1985 American drama film directed by Jerzy Skolimowski. The film stars Klaus Maria Brandauer and Robert Duvall, with early appearances by Arliss Howard and William Forsythe.

The film is based on the novella "Das Feuerschiff" ("The Lightship" in German) by German author Siegfried Lenz which had previously been made into a  German film of the same title in 1963. The film was the last made by CBS Theatrical Films, which went out of business in November 1985. The film was distributed by Castle Hill Productions just nine months after the closure of the studio.

Plot
The story follows the crew of a small ship run by a man named Miller. Sailing out to sea, the ship is taken over by three criminals, one of them named Caspary. Just when they think they are safe, the criminals find themselves battling the crew for control of the vessel.

The conflict between the captain (Brandauer) and his son is an important part of the plot.
The son wants to subdue the criminals, Captain Miller is against the idea.
His son sees this as cowardice, but in reality Miller feels protecting the crew is more important than apprehending the criminals.

Cast 
 Robert Duvall - Caspary
 Klaus Maria Brandauer - Kapitan Miller
 Badja Djola - Nate
 Arliss Howard - Eddie
 William Forsythe - Gene
 Tim Phillips - Thorne
 Tom Bower - Coop
 Michael Lyndon - Alex
 Robert Costanzo - Stump

External links
 
 
 

1986 films
1980s thriller drama films
1980s psychological thriller films
American psychological thriller films
American remakes of German films
American thriller drama films
CBS Theatrical Films films
Films about the United States Coast Guard
Films based on German novels
Films directed by Jerzy Skolimowski
Films scored by Stanley Myers
Films about ship hijackings
1985 drama films
1985 films
1986 drama films
1980s American films